The Maine Black Bears women's basketball team is the basketball team that represents University of Maine in Orono, Maine, United States.  The school's team currently competes in the America East Conference.

History
From 1985 to 2004, the Black Bears went to 15 North Atlantic Conference/America East Conference tournament championships, winning seven of them and finishing as runner-up in the other eight. During the 2017–18 and 2018-19 season Maine has won back to back America East regular season and conference tournament championships.

Year by year results

Postseason
Maine has made nine apperances in the NCAA Division I women's basketball tournament. The combined record of the Black Bears is 1-9.

References

External links